Renata Spagnolo (born 2 January 1989) is an Italian swimmer who competed in the 2008 Summer Olympics.

References

1989 births
Living people
Italian female swimmers
Italian female freestyle swimmers
Olympic swimmers of Italy
Swimmers at the 2008 Summer Olympics
European Aquatics Championships medalists in swimming